Sonata in E minor for flute and basso continuo by J. S. Bach (BWV 1034) is a sonata in four movements:
 Adagio ma non tanto
 Allegro
 Andante
 Allegro

The basso continuo can be provided by a variety of instruments. For example in complete Bach recordings, Stephen Preston on Brilliant Classics (originally recorded by CRD UK) is accompanied by harpsichord and viola da gamba while on Hänssler Classic Jean-Claude Gérard is accompanied by piano and bassoon.

The piece is largely believed to have been written during Bach's Köthen period (1717–23), when he was employed as Kapellmeister for Leopold, Prince of Anhalt-Köthen. However, there is some evidence that this may have been written slightly later, after Bach's move to Leipzig.

References

External links 
 

Flute sonatas by Johann Sebastian Bach
Compositions in E minor